Posht Tang-e Vosta may refer to:

Bapir Vali Allah
Morad Khan